In the Name of the Führer is a 1977 Belgian documentary film directed by Lydia Chagoll. It received the André Cavens Award for Best Film given by the Belgian Film Critics Association (UCC).

References

External links

1977 films
Belgian documentary films